Farewell, My Lovely is a 1975 American neo-noir crime thriller film directed by Dick Richards and featuring Robert Mitchum as private detective Philip Marlowe. The picture is based on Raymond Chandler's novel Farewell, My Lovely (1940), which had previously been adapted for film as Murder, My Sweet in 1944. The supporting cast features Charlotte Rampling, John Ireland, Jack O'Halloran, Sylvia Miles and Harry Dean Stanton, with an early screen appearance by Sylvester Stallone, and hardcore crime novelist Jim Thompson,  in his only acting role, as Charlotte Rampling's character's elderly husband Judge Grayle. Mitchum returned to the role of Marlowe three years later in the 1978 film The Big Sleep, making him the only actor to portray Philip Marlowe more than once in a feature film.

Plot
In 1941 Los Angeles, private detective Philip Marlowe is hired by bank robber Moose Malloy to find his old girlfriend Velma, whom he has not seen in seven years while he has been in prison. Malloy goes to ground after killing the new owner of the nightclub where Velma used to work. Using a photo supplied by Velma's old nightclub friend Tommy Ray, Marlowe traces her to an insane asylum but when he breaks the news to Malloy, he discovers that the photo supposedly of Velma was really of a different woman.

Meanwhile, a man named Marriott hires Marlowe to accompany him to a rendezvous where he is to pay $15,000 ransom for the return of a valuable fei tsui jade necklace stolen from an unnamed female friend. At the location of the pay-off, Marlowe is knocked unconscious by an unseen assailant and when he recovers, the police are at the scene and Marriott has been killed. At the police station Marlowe is told that Malloy has fled to Mexico and is warned to stop looking for Velma.

Deciding to investigate Marriott's death, Marlowe is given a lead on a collector of fei tsui jade named Baxter Grayle, who is a judge and a powerful figure in Los Angeles. At Grayle's mansion he meets Grayle and his wife, the younger and seductive Helen. Helen wants to know who killed Marriott, whom she had known for years, and hires Marlowe to find out. Marlowe is abducted and brought to the brothel operated by Frances Amthor, a notorious madam. Amthor mentions Malloy, then beats and drugs Marlowe. After waking from his drug-induced stupor and discovering the body of Tommy Ray, Marlowe overpowers a guard and confronts Amthor, but she is uncooperative. Jonnie, an employee of Amthor, shoots her when she beats one of her girls, and Marlowe flees to his friend Georgie's house.

Later Helen telephones Marlowe and arranges to meet him at a party later that night. At the party, Marlowe meets underworld figure Laird Brunette, who pays Marlowe $2,000 to arrange a meeting with Malloy. Later Marlowe meets Velma's old nightclub friend Jessie Florian, who says Velma has contacted her and wants to contact Malloy. Marlowe meets with Malloy at Georgie's house, where Velma telephones and arranges to meet him. Marlowe drives him to the motel where Velma is supposedly waiting but instead they are ambushed by two gunmen, who Marlowe kills in a shootout.
  
Marlowe and the police find Jessie Florian murdered. Marlowe suggests to his police friend Nulty that whoever used Florian to set up Malloy at the motel also got Tommy Ray to supply the fake photograph to send him off on a wild goose chase. Marlowe is convinced that Brunette knows what is going on, so he and Malloy sneak aboard Brunette's gambling boat and confront him. Helen appears and it is revealed she is Velma, a former prostitute under Amthor, who married Baxter Grayle without him knowing about her background. Velma has been working with Brunette to kill off anyone who knows her real identity. Velma shoots Malloy and in turn Marlowe shoots her. As Nulty and the police arrive, Marlowe leaves and returns to his hotel room. He decides to give the $2,000 that he had received from Brunette to Tommy Ray's widow and young son, both of whom he had met earlier.

Cast

 Robert Mitchum as Philip Marlowe
 Charlotte Rampling as Helen Grayle / Velma
 John Ireland as Lieutenant Nulty
 Sylvia Miles as Jessie Halstead Florian
 Anthony Zerbe as Laird Brunette
 Harry Dean Stanton as Detective Billy Rolfe
 Jack O'Halloran as "Moose" Malloy
 Joe Spinell as Nick
 Sylvester Stallone as Jonnie
 Rainbeaux Smith as Doris
 Kate Murtagh as Frances Amthor (believed to be based on Brenda Allen)
 John O'Leary as Lindsay Marriott
 Walter McGinn as Tommy Ray
 Burton Gilliam as Cowboy
 Jim Thompson as Judge Baxter Wilson Grayle
 Jimmie Archer as Georgie
 Ted Gehring as Roy

Production

Development and writing
Producer Elliot Kastner had made a series of films based on detective novels, including Harper and The Long Goodbye. The latter was a Philip Marlowe novel by Raymond Chandler and Kastner was keen  to film other Chandler novels. He had a script done which was set in contemporary LA and showed it to director Dick Richards. Richards was interested in filming the book, but only if it was a period piece.

Richards hired David Zelag Goodman to write the screenplay. They set the movie in 1941, so that they could stamp the film "with a time mark" by turning Marlowe into a baseball fan who followed Joe DiMaggio's hitting streak of that year.

Finance
Sir Lew Grade had previously invested in Kastner's film Dogpound Shuffle. The producer approached him to invest in Farewell, My Lovely and Grade agreed, knowing the movie could be easily pre-sold to television. The movie would be part of Grade's initial slate of ten feature films,  including The Return of the Pink Panther, Man Friday and The Tamarind Seed.

Casting
According to Mitchum, Kastner originally wanted the role of Philip Marlowe to be played by Richard Burton, with whom Kastner had worked a number of times. However, Burton was busy so they approached Mitchum. (Richards says he was only ever interested in doing the film with Mitchum.) The star later recalled:
The producer, Elliott Kastner, comes by with Sir Lew Grade, the British tycoon. He has a black suit, a black tie, a white shirt and a whiter face. 'I know nothing about motion pictures,' Sir Lew says. 'What I know is entertainment: Ferris wheels, pony rides.' I suggested we buy up the rights to Murder, My Sweet with Dick Powell, re-release it and go to the beach. But, no, they hired a director, Dick Richards, so nervous he can't hold his legs still. They have all the hide rubbed off them. He started doing TV commercials. He was accustomed to, you know, start the camera, expose 120 feet of film and tell somebody to move the beer bottle half an inch clockwise. He does the same thing with people.
Mitchum reprised the role of Philip Marlowe three years later in The Big Sleep, although that remake was set in the present day and in England, rather than shot as a period piece in the detective's customary setting of Los Angeles. Grade financed that movie as well.

Marlowe's client, Moose Malloy, is played by Jack O'Halloran, a former professional prizefighter. Mitchum called O'Halloran "one great find on this picture. At least, he's a find if we can ever find him again... They hired him for $500 a week. He looked perfect for the part. One time he hit the producer. One of the producers. We had seven of them. We called them the Magnificent Seven. Jack was swinging this poor bastard around his head like an Indian war club. I tried to explain to him: 'The guy can be talked to, Jack.' He shakes his head. 'Mitch,' he says, 'I was crying too hard.'"

Sylvester Stallone, in an early role prior to Rocky, has a memorable brief role as an employee of the brothel's sadistic madam (played by Kate Murtagh).

Jim Thompson, author of popular crime novels like The Getaway and The Grifters, appears in the film as Judge Grayle. Many of Thompson's novels were filmed as major motion pictures.

Joe Spinell, who played Willi Cicci in The Godfather and Stallone's boss in Rocky, is featured as Nicky, a hired thug for Frances Amthor. Spinell was in poor health, but his friend Mitchum made sure that Spinell's scenes were filmed first, so that he could get to the doctors if required.

Production
Mitchum says Charlotte Rampling "arrived with an odd entourage, two husbands or something. Or they were friends and she married one of them and he grew a mustache and butched up. She kept exercising her mouth like she was trying to swallow her ear. I played her on the right side because she had two great big blackheads on her left ear, and I was afraid they'd spring out and lodge on my lip."

Mitchum later admitted, "This kid Richards, the director, he's got something. It'll be a good picture."

Music

Soundtrack
An original motion picture vinyl soundtrack album composed by David Shire was released in 1975 by United Artists Records. The album contained 11 tracks.

Track listing
 1. Main Title (Marlowe's Theme)
 2. Velma / Chinese Pool Hall / To the Mansion
 3. Mrs. Grayle's Theme
 4. Amthor's Place
 5. Mrs. Florian Takes the Full Count
 6. Marlowe's Trip
 7. Convalescence Montage
 8. Take Me to Your Lido
 9. Three Mile Limited
 10. Moose Finds His Velma
 11. End Title (Marlowe's Theme)

Reception

Box office
The film was profitable. Television rights were subsequently sold to NBC for $1.2 million.

Critical response
Critic Roger Ebert gave the film four out of four stars and wrote, "These opening shots are so evocative of Raymond Chandler's immortal Marlowe,  private eye, haunting the underbelly of Los Angeles, that if we're Chandler fans we hold our breath. Is the ambience going to be maintained, or will this be another campy rip-off? Half an hour into the movie, we relax. Farewell, My Lovely never steps wrong...in the genre itself there hasn't been anything this good since Hollywood was doing Philip Marlowe the first time around. One reason is that Dick Richards, the director, takes his material and character absolutely seriously. He is not uneasy with it, as Robert Altman was when he had Elliott Gould flirt with seriousness in The Long Goodbye. Richards doesn't hedge his bet."

Gene Siskel gave the film three stars out of four and wrote that "if a remake of Farewell, My Lovely isn't something fresh—and following on the heels of Chinatown doesn't make it any fresher — at least the casting of Mitchum as Marlowe was inspired. Mitchum, the actor who makes nodding off seem glamorous, plays Marlowe with a delicious ease. He sounds just like Marlowe should sound."

A review in Variety was more critical, calling it "a lethargic, vaguely campy tribute to Hollywood's private eye mellers of the 1940s and to writer Raymond Chandler, whose Philip Marlowe character has inspired a number of features. Despite an impressive production and some first rate performances, this third version fails to generate much suspense or excitement."

Richard Eder of The New York Times described the film as "a handsome mediocrity" with an ending that "may produce some confusion," though he praised "the high quality of a lot of the acting".

Charles Champlin of the Los Angeles Times wrote that the score by David Shire and the casting of Mitchum as Marlowe both seemed "exactly right", but criticized the voice-over narrative, finding that "the effect undercuts the visual splendors and reveals the plot complications at their most preposterous. Too bad, because it breaks the fine mood Richards & Company establish and makes Farewell, My Lovely an interesting but mixed blessing instead of the unmitigated triumph it almost was."

Film critic Dennis Schwartz believes that actor Robert Mitchum was well-cast and wrote, "The film's success lies in Mitchum's hard-boiled portrayal of Marlowe, its twisty plot and the moody atmosphere it creates through John A. Alonzo's photography. Los Angeles looms as a nighttime playground for hoods, beautiful women and suckers ready to be taken by all the glitzy signs leading them astray."

The film maintains a 67% film rating on Rotten Tomatoes, from 27 reviews.

Accolades
Nomination
 Academy Awards: Best Actress in a Supporting Role, Sylvia Miles; 1976.
 Edgar Allan Poe Awards: Best Motion Picture, David Zelag Goodman; 1976.

Previous adaptations
See: Farewell, My Lovely -- Film adaptations
The novel had been adapted for the screen twice before: in 1942, as The Falcon Takes Over directed by Irving Reis and featuring George Sanders as The Falcon in place of Philip Marlowe; and in 1944, as Murder, My Sweet, featuring Dick Powell as Marlowe and directed by Edward Dmytryk.

Mitchum played Marlowe again in 1978's The Big Sleep, becoming the only actor to play the character in two feature films. Actors who played Marlowe in earlier movies include Dick Powell (1944), Humphrey Bogart (1946), Robert Montgomery (1947), George Montgomery (1947), James Garner (1969) and Elliott Gould (1973). After this 1975 film came Poodle Springs, a 1998 neo-noir HBO period film directed by Bob Rafelson, starring James Caan as Marlowe.

References

External links

 
 
 
 
 

1975 films
1970s crime thriller films
1975 LGBT-related films
American crime thriller films
American detective films
1970s English-language films
Films based on American novels
Films directed by Dick Richards
Films produced by Jerry Bruckheimer
Films scored by David Shire
Films set in Los Angeles
Films set in 1941
ITC Entertainment films
Embassy Pictures films
American neo-noir films
Films based on works by Raymond Chandler
1970s American films